Nedtur (literally 'Downturn', released in English as If Music Be the Food of Love) is a Norwegian feature film from 1980 directed by Hans Lindgren. The film is about the life of a musician and his friends. They struggle with both relationships and marriage, and they often party together. There will be a downturn.

Plot
Nils (played by Nils Sletta) is a self-absorbed young jazz musician that expresses himself through music. Christian (Helge Jordal) is Nils` friend and works as a photographer for a weekly magazine. To make extra money, he also takes nude photos. Christian is struggling in his marriage with Kari (Frøydis Armand). Nils and Christian like to party together and drink a lot. One day, Nils' meets the drug addict Elin (Sigrid Huun), and the two become lovers. However, the relationship becomes difficult and they quarrel a lot. When Nils goes on tour one day, he breaks up with Elin. She breaks down and starts using drugs again. Christian, on the other hand, is thrown out of his home and it dawns on him what kind of life he has led. He ends up having a nervous breakdown.

Reception
The newspaper Aftenposten gave the film a "die throw" of 3, and Verdens Gang gave it a "die throw" of 4.

Cast

 Nils Sletta as Nils, a musician
 Sigrid Huun as Elin 
 Helge Jordal as Christian 
 Frøydis Armand as Kari
 Per Blom as a young drug addict
 Anne Marie Ottersen as a girl in the studio
 Kerry-Lou Baylis as the pornographic model
 Arne Berg as the fat man
 Øivind Blunckas the middle-aged man
 Sverre Gran as the debt collector
 Per Hagerup as the drunk man
 Sverre Horge as the homeless man
 Anne Marit Jacobsen as a girl in the studio
 Eyolf Soot Kløvig as the journalist
 Lars Andreas Larssen as the editor
 Unni Løwe as Kim
 William Nyrén as Åge
 Gunhild Pedersen as the unknown girl
 Christin Smit as the secretary
 Egil Storeide as the journalist
 Kari Torbjørnsen as the photo model

References

External links 
 
 Nedtur at the National Library of Norway
 Nedtur at the Swedish Film Database

1980 films
Norwegian drama films
1980s Norwegian-language films
1980 drama films